Charente (Saintongese: Chérente) is a department in the administrative region of Nouvelle-Aquitaine, south western France. It is named after the river Charente, the most important and longest river in the department, and also the river beside which the department's two largest towns, Angoulême and Cognac, are sited. In 2019, it had a population of 352,015.

History
Charente is one of the original 83 departments created during the French Revolution on 4 March 1790. It was created from the former province of Angoumois, and western and southern portions of Saintonge.

Prior to the creation of the department as a single unit, much of it was commercially prosperous thanks to traditional industries such as salt and cognac production. Although the river Charente became silted up and was unnavigable for much of the twentieth century, in the eighteenth century it provided important links with coastal shipping routes both for traditional businesses and for newly evolving ones such as paper goods and iron smelting.

The accelerating pace of industrial and commercial development during the first half of the nineteenth century led to a period of prosperity, and the department's population peaked in 1851. During the second half of the nineteenth century Charente, like many of France's rural departments, experienced a decline in population as the economic prospects available in the cities and in France's overseas empire attracted working-aged people. Economic ruin came to many in the Charentais wine industry with the arrival in 1872 of phylloxera.

During the twentieth century, the department with its traditional industries was adversely impacted by two major world wars, and in the second half of the century, it experienced relatively low growth. The overall population remaining remarkably stable at around 340,000 throughout the second half of the twentieth century, although industrial and commercial developments in the conurbation surrounding Angoulême have added some 10,000 to the overall population during the first decade of the twenty-first century.

The relatively relaxed pace of economic development in the twentieth century encouraged the immigration of retirees from overseas. Census data in 2006 revealed that the number of British citizens residing in the department had risen to 5,083, placing the department fourth in this respect behind Paris, Dordogne and Alpes-Maritimes.

Geography
It is largely part of the Aquitaine Basin, with the north-eastern part in the Massif Central. The Charente flows through it and gave its name to the department, along with Charente-Maritime. It is composed with the historical region of Angoumois and contains part of the regions of Saintonge, Limousin, Périgord and Poitou.

The department is part of the current region of Nouvelle-Aquitaine. It is surrounded by the departments of Charente-Maritime, Dordogne, Haute-Vienne, Vienne and Deux-Sèvres. The southernmost “major” town (town with over 1,000 people) in the Charente is Chalais.

Principal towns

The most populous commune is Angoulême, the prefecture. As of 2019, there are 9 communes with more than 5,000 inhabitants:

Demographics
The inhabitants of the department are called Charentais or in feminine, Charentaise.

Population development since 1791:

Politics

The President of the Departmental Council is Philippe Bouty of the Miscellaneous left (DVG), elected in July 2021.

National Assembly representatives

Economy
Cognac and pineau are two of the major agricultural products of the region, along with butter.  The Charentaise slipper (a type of slipper made from felt and wool) is another well-known traditional product.

Tourism

See also
Cantons of the Charente department
Communes of the Charente department
Arrondissements of the Charente department
Kaolin deposits of the Charentes Basin

Sources

External links

  Prefecture website
  Departmental Council website

 
1790 establishments in France
Nouvelle-Aquitaine region articles needing translation from French Wikipedia
Departments of Nouvelle-Aquitaine
States and territories established in 1790